Khaledabad is a city in Isfahan Province, Iran.

Khaledabad may also refer to various places in Iran:
Khaledabad, Fars
Khaledabad, Marvdasht, Fars Province
Khaledabad, Kerman
Khaledabad, North Khorasan
Khaledabad, Tehran
Khaledabad, Oshnavieh, West Azerbaijan Province
Khaledabad, Urmia, West Azerbaijan Province
Khaledabad Rural District, in Isfahan Province